Sappho (minor planet designation: 80 Sappho) is a large, S-type (stony) main-belt asteroid. It was discovered by English astronomer Norman Pogson on May 2, 1864, and is named after Sappho, the Archaic Greece poet. The orbital plane is inclined at an angle of 8.68° to the plane of the ecliptic.

Hanuš et al. (2013) confirmed the polar axis has ecliptic coordinates  =  and listed a rotation period of 14.03087 h.

Sappho (at apparent magnitude 11.8) occulted the magnitude 7.2 star HIP 24403 in the constellation of Taurus on 16 September 2018 at 8:54 UT. Sacramento and Salt Lake City were the two major cities located underneath the shadow path. Data from this event will help improve the shape model of the asteroid.

References

External links 
 Shape model for 80 Sappho
 
 

Background asteroids
Sappho
Sappho
S-type asteroids (Tholen)
S-type asteroids (SMASS)
18640502

vec:Lista de asteroidi#80 Safo